James, Jamie, Jim, or Jimmy Thomson may refer to:

Arts and letters
 James Thomson (architect, born 1852) (1852–1927), Scottish architect, city architect of Dundee
 James Thomson (poet, born 1700) (1700–1748), Scottish poet and playwright
 James Thomson (weaver poet) (1763–1832), Scottish poet
 James Thomson (poet, born 1834) (1834–1882), Scottish poet and essayist
 James Thomson (engraver) (1788–1850), English engraver, known for his portraits
 James Thomson (journalist) (1852–1934), Australian journalist and newspaper owner
 James Thomson (minister) (1768–1855), Scottish editor of the Encyclopædia Britannica
 James M. Thomson (newspaper publisher) (1878–1959), American newspaper publisher
 Jamie Thomson (author) (born 1958), author of gamebooks

Politicians
 James Thomson (Australian politician) (1856–?), New South Wales politician
 James Thomson (London politician) (born 1966), Common Councilman, Walbrook ward
 James Thomson (Manitoba politician) (1854–?), politician in Manitoba, Canada
 James Thomson (Pittsburgh mayor) (1790–1876), US political figure
 James Thomson (Victorian politician) (1797–1859), pastoralist and politician in colonial Victoria
 James C. Thomson Jr. (1931–2002), American statesman, historian, journalist, and activist
 James Francis Thomson (1891–1973), American politician from Michigan
 James M. Thomson (Virginia politician) (1924–2001), American politician in the Virginia House of Delegates
 James William Thomson (1828–1907), New Zealand politician

Sciences and mathematics
 James Thomson (calico printer) (1779–1850), English industrial chemist
 James Thomson (cell biologist) (born 1958), stem cell researcher
 James Thomson (engineer) (1822–1892), engineer and professor, older brother of William Thomson, 1st Baron Kelvin
 James Thomson (entomologist) (1828–1897), American entomologist
 James Thomson (mathematician) (1786–1849), Irish professor of mathematics, father of William Thomson, 1st Baron Kelvin
 Allan Thomson (geologist) (James Allan Thomson, 1881–1928), New Zealand geologist, scientific administrator and museum director
 James Bates Thomson (1808–1883), American mathematician, educator, and author

Sports

Association footballers
 James Thomson (footballer, fl. 1912–1928), Scottish footballer who played for Manchester United before World War I
 James Thomson (Queen's Park footballer), Scottish footballer
 James J. Thomson (1851–1915), Scottish footballer who played in the first international football match (1872)
 Jim Thomson (footballer, born 1946), Scottish footballer who played for Burnley
 Jim Thomson (footballer, born 1971), Scottish footballer who played for Arbroath, Clyde, Stenhousemuir and Queen of the South where he was Captain
 Jimmy Thomson (footballer, born 1937) (1937–2012), Scottish football player and manager
 Jimmy Thomson (footballer, born 1948), Scottish football player (Newcastle United)

Other sports
 James Thomson (Australian rules footballer) (born 1988)
 James Thomson (cricketer) (1852–1890), New Zealand cricketer
 Jim Thomson (cricketer) (born 1933), New Zealand cricketer
 James Thomson (rower) (1910–1962), American Olympic rower
 Jim Thomson (ice hockey, born 1965), Canadian ice hockey player
 Jimmy Thomson (golfer) (1908–1985), Scottish-American professional golfer
 Jimmy Thomson (ice hockey, born 1927) (1927–1991), Canadian ice hockey player who captained the Toronto Maple Leafs

Other
 James Thomson (executive), CEO of RAND Corporation
 James Beveridge Thomson (1902–1983), Chief Justice of the Federal Court of Malaysia
 James F. Thomson (philosopher) (1921–1984), English philosopher
 James Noel Thomson (1888–1979), officer in the British Indian Army during World War II
 James S. Thomson (1892–1972), President of the University of Saskatchewan and Moderator of the United Church of Canada
 James Turnbull Thomson (1810–1876), publican and brewer, founder of Balhannah, South Australia
 James Stuart Thomson (1868–1932), Scottish zoologist
 James Thomson (pastor), Scottish Baptist pastor and educator

See also
 James Thompson (disambiguation)
 Jamie Thompson (disambiguation)